The  Eastern League season began on approximately April 1 and the regular season ended on approximately September 1. 

The Vermont Reds defeated the Waterbury Angels three games to two to win the Eastern League Championship Series.

Regular season

Standings

Notes:
Green shade indicates that team advanced to the playoffs
Bold indicates that team advanced to ELCS
Italics indicates that team won ELCS

Playoffs

Semi-finals series
Vermont Reds defeated Albany/Colonie A's 3 games to 0.

Waterbury Angels defeated Glens Falls White Sox 3 games to 1.

Championship Series
Vermont Reds defeated Waterbury Angels 3 games to 2.

Attendance

References

External links
1984 Eastern League Review at thebaseballcube.com

Eastern League seasons